Trasianka refers to a mixed form of speech in which Belarusian and Russian elements and structures alternate arbitrarily. There is a similar phenomenon in Ukraine, a Ukrainian–Russian language mixture, called surzhyk.

Etymology 
In Belarusian the word literally means low quality hay, when indigent farmers mix (shake:) fresh grass/straw with the yesteryear's dried hay. The word acquired the second meaning ("language mixture of low quality") relatively recently, in the second half of the 1980s, when a series of publications in the literary newspaper  criticized developments in the use of the Belarusian language under Soviet rule. Zianon Pazniak is often said to be the one who has popularized the use of the word for the Belarusian-Russian language mixture (see Pozniak, 1988). For the Belarusian-Russian borderland it has been reported that the phenomenon usually referred to by the term  is called  instead (this information is based on an interdisciplinary research carried out in the district of Horki and Drybin in 2004).

History

Mixed speech in pre-Soviet and early Soviet era
In the area of present-day Belarus the mixing of speech has a relatively long history. This is because the Belarusian (and, similarly, Ukrainian) territories were for a long time borderlands in which local dialects contacted with closely related socially dominant languages (Polish, Russian). Whether such older forms of mixing Belarusian with Russian should be referred to as “trasianka” is arguable as there was no intergenerational transfer of speech in those times. A literary example for this kind of mixing can be found in the 19th-century play by Wincenty Dunin-Marcinkiewicz The Gentry of Pinsk (see the 1984 edition). Although it is a piece of art and not a record of everyday speech, it can be assumed that it reflects real language use (in certain situations with certain types of people) of that time. A first academic and journalistic debate on Belarusian-Russian mixed speech took place in the 1920s.

After World War II
The phenomenon referred to as “trasianka” since the 1980s had its origins in the fundamental socio-demographic changes which took place in Soviet Belarus after World War II, and in the eastern parts of Belarus partially already before World War II. The industrialization of Soviet Belarus led to a massive labor migration from villages to towns. While in 1959 31% of the population lived in towns, in 1990 the urban share had already reached 66%.  At the same time ethnic Russians from other parts of the Soviet Union migrated to Soviet Belarus and, in many cases, took on leadership tasks in the Belarusian communist party, administration and state companies. Consequently, the language use of former Belarusian villagers - and new town dwellers - had to adapt from (mostly dialectal) Belarusian to standard Russian, a target which speakers seldom reached, however. As a result of this struggle for linguistic accommodation, the so-called trasianka in its contemporary form emerged, and, moreover, children of its speakers grew up using mixed Belarusian-Russian variety.

Linguistic status 
Due to the negative connotation of the word “trasianka” it has been suggested to abandon it in the linguistic debate and use the term “Belarusian-Russian mixed speech” instead.
The scientific discussion on the Belarusian-Russian mixed speech has begun in the first half of the 1990s. Influential Belarusian scholars have pointed out the spontaneous, individual, “piecemeal” or even “chaotic” fashion of Belarusian-Russian speech mixing. These ‘early’  debates were based mainly on informal observations though, due to a lack of text bodies in the mixed speech. A first empirical case study on the phenomenon has been undertaken only in the early 2000s in the capital Minsk.
In the years 2008-2013 a research project carried out by linguists and social scientists at the University of Oldenburg (in cooperation with partners from the Belarusian State University in Minsk) has created two bodies of oral texts in the mixed speech . The linguistic results of the mentioned research project attested the older view that Belarusian-Russian mixed speech could yet not be classified as one relatively stable, homogenous fused lect all over Belarus. On the other hand, on all levels of the linguistic structure several country-wide relatively stable patterns could be observed which the mixed speech shares with one or both of its “donor” languages (Belarusian and Russian) or which, respectively, make the mixed speech differ from both donor languages. Russian elements and traits clearly dominate in the lexicon as well as in morphosyntax. The inflectional morphology is obviously a hybrid, and even the pronunciation is influenced by Russian. All in all, the Belarusian-Russian mixed speech in its current stage is classified as a complex of regional social dialects. Other studies keep on describing the Belarusian-Russian mixed speech as a "chaotic" and "spontaneous" phenomenon of language mixing.

Sociology of mixed speech use 
The sociological and sociolinguistic component of the above-mentioned research project on mixed language use in Belarus showed, inter alia, the following results: Asked about their ‘native language’, roughly 38% of around 1200 respondents named the Belarusian-Russian mixed speech, 49% Belarusian and 30% Russian (more than one answer was allowed). As their ‘first language’ roughly 50% declared the mixed speech, 42% Russian and 18% Belarusian (again more than one answer was allowed). Finally, as their ‘primarily used language’ roughly 55% named Russian, 41% the mixed speech and 4% Belarusian.
The results of the research project contradict the popular opinion that the use of Belarusian-Russian mixed speech is an indicator for a poor education level and a lack of proficiency in Russian or Belarusian standard language.  The mixed speech is widespread among Belarusians from all educational levels and age groups and used alongside the standard language, which in most cases is Russian. The degree to which individuals tend to approximate ‘their’ mixed speech use to Russian or, respectively, to Belarusian depends on such factors as interlocutors, conversation place, topic etc. Among young Belarusians the relative weight of mixed speech use decreases in favour of Russian.

Phonology 

Phonology of Belarusian-Russian mixed speech is closer to Belarusian. From the point of view of the Russian speaker, the following distinctions are noticeable:
 presence of palatal affricate consonants [dz̪ʲ], [ts̪ʲ] instead of [dʲ], [tʲ], i.e. [ˈdz̪ʲenʲ] – "день", "day" – instead of [ˈdʲenʲ], [ˈts̪ʲixʲɪ] – "тихий", "quiet" – instead of [ˈtʲixʲɪj]
 absence of palatalization of the consonant in front of [j], i.e. [ˈpjʉt] – "пьют", "(they) drink" – instead of [ˈpʲjʉt]
 assimilative palatalization of the consonants, i.e. [ˈdz̪ʲvʲerɨ] – "двери", "doors" – instead of [ˈdvʲerʲɪ]
 aspirate [sʲ], i.e. [ˈsʲʰvʲatə] ("свята", "holiday"), [ˈʂɛsʲʰts̪ʲ] ("шесть", "six")
 “hard” hushing sibilants, [ʈ͡ʂ] as in Belarusian instead of [t͡ɕ] as in Russian, i.e. [ˈʈ͡ʂaʂkə] – "чашка", "cup" – instead of [ˈt͡ɕæʂkə]
 “hard” [r] instead of [rʲ], i.e. [ˈtrapkə] – "тряпка", "rag" – instead of [ˈtrʲæpkə]
 presence of non-syllabic bilabial [ʊ] in place of etymological (в) and (л) and instead of Russian normative [l] in the end of the word, i.e. [ˈpraʊdə] – "правда", "truth" – instead of [ˈpravdə], [ˈvoʊk] – "волк", "wolf" – instead of [ˈvolk], [pʲɪˈsaʊ] – "писал", "(he) wrote" – instead of [pʲɪˈsal]

Vocabulary 

Belarusian-Russian mixed speech mostly includes Russian words which have Belarusian analogue shaped by Belarusian phonology and morphology. Some examples of high-frequency Russian words are (Belarusian and English translations are given in parenthesis):
 Nouns:  ("child"),  ("flower"),  ("money")
 Verbs:  ("to work"),  ("to do"),  ("to wait")
 Adjectives:  ("past"),  ("next"),  ("beautiful"),  ("bad")
Many words have Russian stem, but other morphemes come from Belarusian.

Part of vocabulary comes exclusively from Belarusian (Russian and English translations are given in parenthesis when necessary):
 Family titles:  ("mother"),  ("father"),  ("daughter"); some words sound the same in both languages:  ("son"),  ("brother"),  ("grandma"); or differ by regular phonetic substitutions:  ("sister"),  ("son-in-law"),  ("daughter-in-law"),  ("grandpa"),  ("grandson"),  ("bride"),  ("bridegroom").
 Name of some fruits and vegetables:  ("potato"),  ("beet"),  ("thyme")
 The word  ("home”)

Professional and urban words are borrowed almost exclusively from Russian.

Morphology 

Inflection mostly conforms with the norms of the Belarusian language. Russian and Belarusian have different norms of declension, especially case declension. For instance, in the instrumental case in Russian masculine nouns ending in -а have inflection -ей, -ой, while in Belarusian the ending becomes -ам – the norm that is present in Belarusian-Russian mixed speech: гаварыла з Мишам, з Вовам ("spoke with Misha, with Vova").

Verbs in the 3rd person singular miss final -т, including verbs coming from Russian: атвячае ("(she) answers"), знае ("(she) knows"), таргуе ("(she) sells"). Sometimes, it is replaced with -ц: атвячаець, знаець, таргуець. In the infinitive form of Russian verbs final -ть is replaced with -ц: весиць ("to weight"), знаць ("to know").

Postfix -ся is more frequently used, even when Russian norm requires -сь: началася ("(she has) started"), баялася ("(she) was afraid"), прышлося ("had to"), спуталася ("become tangled"), учылися ("(they) studied").

The imperative form is similar to the Belarusian norm: verbs ending in -[i] or -[o], which are under stress, i.e. ждицё мяне ("wait for me").

See also 
 Taraškievica
 Narkamaŭka
 Russification of Belarus
 Surzhyk
 West Polesian language
 Russenorsk
 Languages of Belarus

References

Further reading 
DUNIN-MARTSINKIEVICH, Vintsent (1984): Tvory. Ed. by Ia. Ianushkevich. Minsk: Mastatskaia litaratura.
HENTSCHEL, Gerd (2013): Belorusskij, russkij i belorussko-russkaja smeshannaja rech‘."Voprosy jazykoznanija", No. 1, pp.  53–76.
HENTSCHEL, Gerd (2014): Belarusian and Russian in the Mixed Speech of Belarus. In: Besters-Dilger, J., et al. (eds.): Congruence in Contact-Induced Language Change. Berlin/Boston: de Gruyter, pp. 93–121.
HENTSCHEL, Gerd, and KITTEL, BERNHARD (2011): Weißrussische Dreisprachigkeit? Zur sprachlichen Situation in Weißrussland auf der Basis von Urteilen von Weißrussen über die Verbreitung "ihrer Sprachen" im Lande. "Wiener Slawistischer Almanach", No. 67, pp.  107–135.
HENTSCHEL, Gerd, and ZELLER, JAN PATRICK (2012): Gemischte Rede, gemischter Diskurs, Sprechertypen: Weißrussisch, Russisch und gemischte Rede in der Kommunikation weißrussischer Familien.  "Wiener Slawistischer Almanach", No. 70, pp.  127–155
 KALITA I. V. (2010) Современная Беларусь: языки и национальная идентичность. Ústí nad Labem, 2010, 300 s. s. 112-190.
 KITTEL, Bernhard et al. (2010): Mixed Language Usage in Belarus. The Sociostructural Background of Language Choice. "International Journal of the Sociology of Language", No. 206, pp.  47–71.
LISKOVETS, Irina V. (2002): Trasianka: proiskhozhdeniie, sushchnost', funkcionirovaniie. Antropologiia, fol'kloristika, lingvistika, 2, pp. 329–343.
LISKOVETS, Irina V. (2003): Project Novyie iazyki novykh gosudarstv: iavleniia na styke blizkorodstvennykh iazykov na postsovetskom prostranstve. (The part on Belarus.) European University in Sankt-Peterburg.
MECHKOVSKAIA, Nina B. (1994): Iazykovaia situaciia v Belarusi: Eticheskiie kollizii dvuiazychiia. Russian Linguistics, 18, pp. 299–322.
MECHKOVSKAIA, Nina B. (2002): Iazyk v roli ideologii: nacional'no-simvolicheskiie funkcii iazyka v belorusskoi iazykovoi situacii. In: Gutschmidt, K., et al. (eds.): Möglichkeiten und Grenzen der Standardisierung slavischer Schriftsprachen in der Gegenwart. Dresden: Thelem, pp. 123–141.
MECHKOVSKAIA, Nina B. (2006): Belorusskaia trasianka i ukrainskii surzhik: surrogaty etnicheskogo substandarta v ikh otnosheniiakh k massovoi kul'ture i literaturnym iazykam. In Problemy zistavnoi semantyky, vyp. 7. Kiev: Kyivs'kyi nacional'nyi linhvistychnyi universytet.
MIACHKOUSKAIA, Nina B. (2007): Трасянка ў кантынууме беларуска-рускіх ідыялектаў: хто і калі размаўляе на трасянцы? [Trasianka in the continuum of Belarusian-Russian ideolects: who speaks trasianka and when]. Веснік БДУ, серыя 4 (1).
POZNIAK, Zenon (1988): Dvuiazychiie i biurokratizm. Raduga, No. 4, pp. 36–50.
SENDER, Natallia: Spracheinstellung zur weißrussisch - russischen Mischsprache Trasjanka in Belarus, Frankfurt/Oder, Univ., Masterarbeit.
TSYKHUN, Henadz A. (2000): Krealizavany pradukt (trasianka iak ab'iekt linhvistychnaha dasledavannia). ARCHE - Paczatak, 6.
WOOLHISER, Curt (2001): Language ideology and language conflict in post-Soviet Belarus. In O'Reilly, C. C. (ed.): Language, Ethnicity and the State, vol. 2. Palgrave, pp. 91–122.

External links 
 Studies on Belarusian-Russian mixed speech published at the University of Oldenburg, Slavic Department
  The Oldenburg corpus of Belarusian-Russian Mixed Speech
  Two examples of Trasianka

Belarusian language
Russian language varieties and styles
Russian dialects
Code-switching
Russification
Russian language in Belarus